The 1887 Penn State football team was an American football team that represented Pennsylvania State College—now known as Pennsylvania State University–as an independent during the 1887 college football season. The team went  2–0 and are the school's only unscored-upon team. The quarterback of this team was George H. "Lucy" Linsz. He later changed his last name from Linsz to Lins, probably during World War I.  In 1887, Penn State's school colors were dark pink and black.

Schedule

‡There is a date discrepancy. Bucknell lists this game as being played on November 12, 1887.

References

Penn State
Penn State Nittany Lions football seasons
College football undefeated seasons
Penn State football